Dial Records may refer to:

 Dial Records (1946), a U.S.-based jazz and classical label, active 1946–1954
 Dial Records (1964), a U.S.-based R&B label, active 1964–1979
 Dial Records (1998), a U.S.-based rock label
 Dial Records (1999), a German-based dance music label
 Dial Records (UK label), a defunct label founded by William Barrington-Coupe and David Gooch

See also
 List of record labels